Catharina Josepha Pratten  (15 November 1824 – 10 October 1895) was a German guitar virtuoso, composer and teacher, also known as Madame Sidney Pratten.

She was born Catharina Josepha Pelzer in Mülheim on the 15 November 1824, the daughter of the German guitarist and music teacher Ferdinand Pelzer.

On 24 September 1854, she married the flautist Robert Sidney Pratten.

She died on 10 October 1895. She is buried at Brompton Cemetery, London.

Her guitar was advertised for sale in The Times in "splendid condition" in 1939.

References

External links
 

1824 births
1895 deaths
19th-century guitarists
Burials at Brompton Cemetery
Composers for the classical guitar
19th-century German composers
German classical composers
19th-century German women musicians
19th-century women composers
German classical guitarists
German women classical composers
German expatriates in the United Kingdom
People from Mülheim